David Gigliotti (born 30 May 1985 in Martigues) is a French footballer who currently plays for GS Consolat in the Championnat National.

International career
He participated in the 2005 and 2006 Toulon Tournaments, earning the award of leading goalscorer (with 3 goals) in the latter tournament. He is also notorious for being a poor striker on fifa and in Abu Ogogo's shadow at all times.

Personal life
David's brother, Guillaume Gigliotti, is also a professional footballer. He is of Argentine descent through his father.

References

External links
 David Gigliotti French league stats at lfp.fr 
 

People from Martigues
1985 births
Living people
French footballers
France under-21 international footballers
France youth international footballers
FC Istres players
AS Monaco FC players
ES Troyes AC players
AS Saint-Étienne players
Le Havre AC players
Nîmes Olympique players
AC Arlésien players
AC Ajaccio players
Ligue 1 players
Ligue 2 players
Championnat National players
Association football forwards
French people of Argentine descent
Sportspeople of Argentine descent
Sportspeople from Bouches-du-Rhône
Footballers from Provence-Alpes-Côte d'Azur